Philodromus peninsulanus is a species of running crab spider in the family Philodromidae. It is found in the United States and Canada.

References

peninsulanus
Articles created by Qbugbot
Spiders described in 1934